Arrowsmith Township is located in McLean County, Illinois. As of the 2010 census, its population was 502 and it contained 203 housing units. Arrowsmith Township is named for Ezekiel Arrowsmith (1811–1894), the first supervisor of the township. The township was originally called "Pleasant", but since there was already a Pleasant Township in Illinois, the name was changed in honor of the first superintendent. Arrowsmith Township changed its name from Pleasant Township on May 17, 1858.

The village of Arrowsmith is located in this township. Illinois Route 9 follows the northern boundary of the township. The Horizon Wind Energy Twin Groves Wind Farm is roughly centered in Arrowsmith township.  Twin Groves is the largest utility-scale wind farm east of the Mississippi River.

Geography

Demographics

References

External links
 US Census
 City-data.com
 Illinois State Archives

Townships in McLean County, Illinois
Populated places established in 1858
1858 establishments in Illinois
Townships in Illinois